Mariel Lancy Galdiano (born June 25, 1998) is an American amateur golfer.

At age 13 she was the youngest golfer at the 2011 U.S. Women's Open.

Galdiano made the cut at the 2015 U.S. Women's Open. She won her sectional qualifier to earn entry into the tournament.

Galdiano is a three-time Hawaii High School Athletic Association champion.

Galdiano won the 2015 Canadian Women's Amateur.

At the 2017 Summer Universiade (World University Games), Galdiano won the gold medal in the individual event and led the United States to the team gold medal.

Amateur wins
2013 Callaway Junior World Golf Championships (Girls 15–17)
2014 Jennie K Wilson Invitational, Joanne Winter Arizona Silver Belle Championship
2015 Canadian Women's Amateur
2017 Summer Universiade – individual gold medal
2018 Golfweek Conference Challenge, Stanford Intercollegiate

Source:

Team appearances
Amateur
Junior Solheim Cup (representing the United States): 2015 (winners)
Curtis Cup (representing the United States): 2016, 2018 (winners)
Espirito Santo Trophy (representing the United States): 2016
Arnold Palmer Cup (representing the United States): 2018 (winners), 2019

References

American female golfers
Amateur golfers
Universiade medalists in golf
Universiade gold medalists for the United States
Medalists at the 2017 Summer Universiade
1998 births
Living people
21st-century American women